Breweries in Nebraska produce a wide range of beers in different styles that are marketed locally and regionally. Brewing companies vary widely in the volume and variety of beer produced,  from small nanobreweries and microbreweries to massive multinational conglomerate macrobreweries.

In 2012 Nebraska's 38 brewing establishments (including breweries, brewpubs, importers, and company-owned packagers and wholesalers) employed 100 people directly, and more than 6,700 others in related jobs such as wholesaling and retailing. Altogether 19 people in Nebraska had active brewer permits in 2012.

Including people directly employed in brewing, as well as those who supply Nebraska's breweries with everything from ingredients to machinery, the total business and personal tax revenue generated by Nebraska's breweries and related industries was more than $132 million. Consumer purchases of Nebraska's brewery products generated more than $70 million extra in tax revenue. In 2012, according to the Brewers Association, Nebraska ranked 16th in the number of craft breweries per capita with 19.

For context, at the end of 2013 there were 2,822 breweries in the United States, including 2,768 craft breweries subdivided into 1,237 brewpubs, 1,412 microbreweries and 119 regional craft breweries.  In that same year, according to the Beer Institute, the brewing industry employed around 43,000 Americans in brewing and distribution and had a combined economic impact of more than $246 billion.

Breweries

The following is a list of Nebraska-based breweries, meaderies and cideries.

Closed Breweries

See also
 List of breweries in the United States
 List of microbreweries

References

External links
 "Nebraska Brewery Listings", Brewery Collectibles Club of America, retrieved 11 April 2017.
 "Breweries in Nebraska, United States", Beer Me!, retrieved 18 February 2014.

Nebraska
Breweries